Big Brother Canada is a Canadian television reality game show based on the Dutch reality show of the same name, which is part of the wider Big Brother franchise. The first season of the series premiered on February 27, 2013, on Slice. Starting with the third season, the show is aired on Global. The series is produced by Endemol and Insight Productions. It is hosted by Arisa Cox, who is concurrently an executive producer starting from the ninth season.

The show follows the premise originated by the American version of the show, in which a group of contestants, known as "HouseGuests", live together in a specially constructed house that is isolated from the outside world as they compete for a $100,000 cash prize, as well as additional prizes from the show's sponsors. The HouseGuests are continuously monitored during their stay in the house by live television cameras as well as personal audio microphones.

A live feed into the house is available for viewers to watch for free through the show's website. Big Brother Canada is the first incarnation of the series to adopt the format used in the United States, which greatly differs from others. The rules of the series have also been altered throughout each season through "twists" added to the game.

The series was put on hiatus following the conclusion of the fifth season, but fan support saw the series renewed for a sixth season. The tenth season premiered on March 2, 2022.

Since it first premiered, Big Brother Canada has aired more than 200 episodes and has featured 147 HouseGuests.

History
The Big Brother franchise was first seen in Canada in 2000, after Global acquired the rights to air the United States edition from CBS. The series has also been broadcast on former sister network, CH. A French-Canadian version of Loft Story, the France-produced version of the series, premiered in 2003. The show was succeeded by an official Quebec-produced edition of Big Brother in 2010, which aired for one season.

Global's then-parent company, Shaw Media, announced on May 30, 2012, that an English adaptation of the series would launch in Canada on digital cable channel, Slice. The network later confirmed that live feeds from the Big Brother house would be available to Canadian viewers for free, unlike the subscription-based United States edition. Big Brother Canada was initially set to premiere on February 18, 2013; this was later pushed back to February 27. The show was greenlit for a second season following the ratings success of the first; a new house was built prior to the launch of the second season. It was confirmed after the conclusion of the second season that the show would be moving to Global.

Following the show's fifth season, it was announced by Global that the series had been placed on an indefinite hiatus for undisclosed reasons. The announcement led to backlash from fans of the series, who petitioned to bring the show back on air. Less than two months after the announcement, it was confirmed that the series would be returning for a sixth season in 2018 due to the large amount of fan support. Prior to the launch of the sixth season, a third House for the series was built with the same layout as the previous one. The seventh season of the series was confirmed by host Arisa Cox in June 2018. It premiered in March 2019.

Season 8 saw many series firsts for the Canadian franchise as two HouseGuests had to be removed due to a violation of house rules and production abruptly ended on March 24, 2020, due to the restrictions brought upon by the COVID-19 pandemic, culminating in a season finale airing on April 1, 2020, with no winner being proclaimed.

Rules and format
There are a number of rules imposed on the HouseGuests competing in the series. The participants are under constant audio and video surveillance, and are required to wear personal microphones at all time. Contestants have no access to phones, television, internet, magazines, newspaper, and are prohibited from contact with those not in the house. The Bible and other religious literature are the only books allowed in the house. Described as a "social experiment", the concept of the show forces people to live in a home with people who may share differing ideals, beliefs, or prejudices. The doors to the house remained locked at all times, though a HouseGuest is free to quit the game whenever they choose; however, once leaving the house, they are not permitted to re-enter. Should a contestant break the rules of the game, they could be expelled and immediately removed from the house. Unlike other versions of Big Brother, the HouseGuests may discuss the nomination and eviction process openly and freely.

Each week the HouseGuests compete in several competitions in order to win power and safety inside the house, before voting off one of the HouseGuests on during the eviction. The main elements of the format are as follows:
Head of Household (HoH): At the start of each week in the house, the HouseGuests compete for the title of Head of Household, often shortened to simply HoH. The Head of Household for each week is given luxuries such as their own personal bedroom and the use of an MP3 player, but is responsible for nominating two of their fellow HouseGuests for eviction. The Head of Household would not be able to compete in the following week's Head of Household competition; this excludes the final Head of Household competition of the season.
Power of Veto (PoV): After the nominees are determined, the Power of Veto competition is played, with the winner receiving the Power of Veto. If a HouseGuest chooses to exercise the Power of Veto, the Head of Household is responsible for naming a replacement nominee. The holder of the Power of Veto is safe from being nominated as the replacement nominee.
 Veto Players: During seasons 1–6, only six HouseGuests competed for the Power of Veto each week; the Head of Household and both nominees would be guaranteed to play, alongside three others selected by a random draw. From season 7 onwards, there would only be 5 veto players (2 nominees, and 3 randomly drawn HouseGuests) with the HoH prohibited from playing until the Final 5 round.
Eviction: On eviction night, all HouseGuests must vote to evict one of the nominees, with the exception of the nominees and the Head of Household. The eviction vote is by secret ballot, with HouseGuests casting their votes orally in the Diary Room. In the event of a tied vote, the Head of Household will cast a tie-breaking vote publicly. The nominee with the majority of the votes is evicted from the house.

Upon reaching the middle point in the game, the evicted HouseGuests go on to become members of the "jury"; the jury is responsible for choosing who wins the series. The members of the jury are not shown any Diary Room interviews or any footage that may include strategy or details regarding nominations. The amount of HouseGuest involved in the Jury has varied slightly throughout the series but will typically involve the last 7 evicted HouseGuests. The final Head of Household competition is split into three parts; the winners of the first two rounds compete in the third and final round. Once only two HouseGuests remain, the members of the jury cast their votes for who should win the series.

Notable contestants

In total, there have been one hundred eighteen HouseGuests to compete in Big Brother Canada. In addition to this, there have been seven potential HouseGuests that did not enter the house and eight HouseGuests that have competed in two seasons. Season one HouseGuests Jillian MacLaughlin and Emmett Blois went on to participate in the fourth season of The Amazing Race Canada; the duo came in second place. Blois later went on to enter the Big Brother Mzansi house in South Africa as a guest; he remained in house for a week, attempting to cause trouble among the contestants. Demetres Giannitsos and Dane Rupert hold the record for the most Head of Household wins in a single season with five, while Kevin Martin, Adam Pike and combined HouseGuests Nick & Phil Paquette hold the record for most Power of Veto wins in a single season with four. Giannitsos, Martin, Paquette brothers, Pike, and Rupert are all also tied for the most total competition wins in a single season, with seven each. Martin, alongside HouseGuests Ashleigh Wood, Kaela Grant and Rohan Kapoor are the only HouseGuests to win three consecutive Power of Veto competitions. Martin has also spent the most time in the house of any HouseGuest, with a total of 118 days. Season 9 winner Tychon Carter-Newman is the first black houseguest to win Big Brother Canada, and the second (after Celebrity Big Brother 2 winner Tamar Braxton) to win a season of Big Brother in North America.

Spin-offs 
Following the announcement of the series, it was confirmed that the spin-off series Big Brother Canada: After Dark would air alongside the show. Originating from the United States show of the same name, it provided a live look into the house and aired on Slice. The series began airing exclusively online following the fourth season. The Big Brother Side Show began airing alongside the second season of the show in 2014. Originally hosted by Cox alongside former HouseGuests Gary Levy and Peter Brown, the show featured interviews with the weekly evicted HouseGuest and aired immediately following the eviction episodes. It was confirmed in 2016 that Sarah Hanlon would replace Levy as co-host to the series. The show was cancelled in 2017 prior to the fifth season of Big Brother Canada, and was replaced instead by a Facebook chat with Cox following each eviction episode.

Series overview

Notes
: Fourteen HouseGuests entered the house on Day 1, while three additional contestants faced Canada's vote to decide who would be the final HouseGuest. The three contestants entered a secret room on Day 8, and the winning HouseGuest entered the house on Day 15.
: As part of a twist, Canada joined the jury as its seventh member. The recipient of the vote was determined by a public vote open to Canadian residents and was cast by Arisa Cox on behalf of the nation. Canada voted for Jon Pardy to be the winner..
: Fourteen HouseGuests entered the house on Day 1, while four former contestants of other editions of Big Brother faced Canada's vote to decide which two will enter the house as "international wildcards". These HouseGuests entered the house on Day 7. In a second twist, a pair of brothers played the game as one HouseGuest.
: Eight of the HouseGuests this season were returning players from the first four seasons, while the other eight were new players.
: Fourteen HouseGuests entered the house on Day 1, while the Canadian public voted between two sets of two contestants (one consisting of men and one consisting of women) to enter the house as the final two HouseGuests of the season. These HouseGuests entered on Day 6.
: Fourteen HouseGuests entered the house on Day 1, while the Canadian public voted between two contestants to enter the house as the final HouseGuest of the season. This HouseGuest then had to complete a mission to officially enter the game.
: The eighth season was planned to run for 83 days but production had to end early due to the COVID-19 pandemic. As a result, there was no winner as the game did not reach a conclusion. 
: As part of a twist, Canada joined the jury as its ninth member. The recipient of the vote was determined by a public vote open to Canadian residents and was cast by Arisa Cox on behalf of the nation. Canada voted for Kevin Jacobs to be the winner.

International broadcast
The series airs on the following channels outside of Canada:

In Australia, season 9 was made available to stream on 7plus in November 2021. Season 10 started streaming in late March 2022 with episodes being uploaded weekly.
In the United States, the series, excluding season 8, was added to Paramount+ on 16 February 2022.

Reception

Since its premiere in 2013, Big Brother Canada has been met with a positive reaction from viewers. Calum Marsh with National Post called the show "one of the most thrilling things on television" following the conclusion of the sixth season. The show was a ratings success during its run on Slice, with the first three episodes of the season causing a 24% increase in Slice's viewership. The show averaged 2.7 million viewers per week, at one point reaching a peak of 4.2 million in one week. The second season reached more than 6.4 million viewers during its run, becoming the number one specialty reality program of the year in key demographics. It was reported that the show's official website was visited more than 46 million times during the season. The show's seventh season saw the highest overall average for the series in terms of ratings, while season two was the least viewed season.

The show has been compared positively to the United States edition of the series on which it is based, with several fans and publications citing it as the superior series. The sophomore season was ranked as the fourth best North American season by BuzzFeed in 2018, with the fifth season coming in seventh place. Producer Trevor Boris has been praised for his role in the series, including producing the challenges and voicing the recurring character Marsha the Moose. He later went on to work on adaptions of the show in the United States and the United Kingdom. The series has received criticism for issues such as blocking the live feeds from viewers for long periods of time and for being seemingly "over-produced". Since it debuted, Big Brother Canada has been nominated for a total of fourteen Canadian Screen Awards, winning Best Production Design or Art Design in a Non-Fiction Program or Series at the 2015 ceremony. It has also been nominated for two Canadian Cinema Editors Awards, once in 2016 and once in 2017.

Accolades

Canadian Screen Awards

See also
Big Brother (franchise)
Big Brother (American TV series)

References

External links
Official website

 
Slice (TV channel) original programming
Global Television Network original programming
2010s Canadian reality television series
2013 Canadian television series debuts
Television shows filmed in Toronto
Television series by Corus Entertainment
Television series by Endemol
Canadian television series based on Dutch television series
2020s Canadian reality television series
Television series by Insight Productions